Ebrahim Daoud Nonoo (also known as Abraham David Nonoo, born: 1960 ) is a Bahraini businessman. He sat in the appointed upper house of the Bahraini Parliament's Shura Council between 2001 and 2006, the first and only Jewish member of the council. He is the current CEO of the Basma Company and president of the Association of Gulf Jewish Communities (AGJC)

The Nonoo family is originally from Basra, Iraq having moved to Bahrain over a century ago along with hundreds of Jews from Iraq who sought economic opportunities there, but continued to speak the Basrawi dialect. In 2006, Nonoo financed repairs to the country's only synagogue.

See also 
 Nancy Khedouri
 Houda Nonoo

References

External links
The Basma Company

Living people
Bahraini Jews
Jewish Bahraini politicians
Members of the Council of Representatives (Bahrain)
Bahraini businesspeople
Bahraini people of Iraqi-Jewish descent
1960 births
Sephardi politicians